George Michael Lydon (born 25 November 1933) is an English former footballer who played as an inside forward.

Lydon played league football for Leeds United and Gateshead between 1954 and 1959 after starting his career at hometown club Sunderland.

Sources

1933 births
Living people
English footballers
Association football forwards
Sunderland A.F.C. players
Leeds United F.C. players
Gateshead F.C. players
English Football League players